Kythera (minor planet designation: 570 Kythera) is a large, main belt asteroid orbiting the Sun. It was discovered in 1905 by German astronomer M. F. Wolf at Heidelberg, and was named after the Greek island of Kythira that is associated with Aphrodite. The object is a member of the Cybele asteroid group.

References

External links
 
 
 

Cybele asteroids
Kythera
Kythera
ST-type asteroids (Tholen)
T-type asteroids (SMASS)
19050730